Dunia (English title: Kiss Me Not on the Eyes) is a 2005 Egyptian film directed by Jocelyne Saab and starring Hanan Tork and Mohamed Mounir. It was premiered in the 2005 Cairo International Film Festival.

Synopsis 
Student of Sufi poetry and belly dance in Cairo, Dunia is looking for herself and wishes to become a professional dancer. During casting for a dance contest, she meets the illustrious and charming Dr Bechir, a Sufi thinker and writer. With him, Dunia will discover not only the pleasure of words through Sufi poetry, but also the pleasure of the senses. However, she will have to confront tradition, which destroyed her capacity to feel pleasure, in order to free her body and dance with her soul.

Awards 

 Cairo International Film Festival 2005 (Honorable Award)
 Algarve International Film Festival 2006 (International Jury Award: Best Film)
 Fribourg 2006
 Milan 2006
 Singapur 2006

External links

References

2005 films
2000s feminist films
Films about blind people
Films about freedom of expression
Egyptian drama films
French drama films
Libyan films
Moroccan drama films
2000s dance films
French dance films
2000s French films